Don Benito Díaz Iraola (17 July 1898 – 1 April 1990) was a Spanish football manager and player.

He played mainly for Real Sociedad.

He coached Real Sociedad, Bordeaux and Atlético Madrid.

References

External links
Biography

1898 births
1990 deaths
Spanish footballers
Real Sociedad footballers
Spanish football managers
Real Sociedad managers
FC Girondins de Bordeaux managers
Atlético Madrid managers
Association football forwards